Qingzhou is a town in Shaxian District, Sanming, Fujian, China.

Township-level divisions of Fujian
Sha County